Lima Cricket & Football Club is a Peruvian sports club based in the country's capital city of Lima. Lima Cricket claims to be both the oldest cricket club in South America, and the oldest association football-practising club in Peru and the Americas, having been founded in 1859 by the city's British community. The football team currently participates in the local league of San Isidro District, Lima.

The club is the de facto home of the Peru Cricket Association, and hosts the National T20 Cricket League during the summer months of January to April. It has also hosted a number of international tournaments, featuring the Peru national cricket team. The most recent was the South American Championship in April, 2014, with competing teams from Argentina (men & women), Brazil (men & women), Chile and Mexico (men only).

Apart from football and cricket, nowadays the club hosts the practise of basketball, basque pelota, fencing, field hockey, squash, table tennis, tennis, swimming, volleyball, and water aerobics (rugby union is no longer practised). Other social activities include bocce, darts, pilates, snooker, and zumba.

History 
The club was founded by English immigrants as the "Lima Cricket Club". From its start, the club hosted the practise of several sports such as cricket, rugby union, and football and tennis.

Over time, other sports gained popularity within the club, and thus its name several times such as in 1865 to "Lima Cricket and Lawn Tennis Club" (when it merged with a local tennis club) and to "Lima Cricket and Football Club" in 1906 (although another source dates this as 1900).

Despite its members having played football since its origins, the first recorded football match was on August 7, 1892. Following on this event, the club now officially added a football-departement in 1893. It took on the current name on April 30, 1906. Lima Cricket went on to inspire future football clubs in Peru, such as Union Cricket.

As Lima C&FC was part of an elite football clubs composed entirely of high-society families, unlike other raising clubs that accepted members and players from popular sectors of Lima. This was notable since the beginning of the 1920s. As a result, Limas CFC would be relegated from the top ranks at the hands of clubs that recruited their players from a much larger pool.

Rivalries
His first rivalry was with the Ciclista Lima who dispute the (Classic of Yesteryear).

Honours

National 
Peruvian Primera División: 2
Winners (2): 1912, 1914
 Runner-up (1): 1913

Regional
Liga Distrital de San Isidro:
Winners (4): 2007, 2008, 2012, 2016
 Runner-up (3): 2009, 2010, 2011

See also
List of football clubs in Peru
Peruvian football league system
Genoa Cricket and Football Club

Bibliography

References

External links
 Official website
 La difusión del fútbol en Lima (Spanish)
 List of Peru football champions at RSSSF
 Cricket Peru

Football clubs in Lima
Sport in Lima
Cricket in Peru
Club cricket teams
1859 establishments in Peru
Association football clubs established in 1859